The American School of Madrid (ASM) was founded in 1961. It is a private, K-12 international school in Madrid, Spain.

History 

The American School of Madrid was founded in 1961 by members of The American Club in Madrid. 

It was initially located in several buildings in the Madrid: Calle Joaquin Costa, Calle Dr. Fleming and Calle Pinar. Kelly Gardener was the first Headmaster. In 1962, ASM Board architect, Bob Parker, obtained a ten-acre plot on the outskirts of Madrid, near Aravaca, as a future home of the school.  On November 2, 1967, ASM opened in its current location.

Campus 

ASM is an IB World School and offers the full IB Diploma Programme. The K-12 program is accredited by the Middle States Association of Colleges and Schools and the Spanish Ministry of Education.  The 11-acre campus is located just 10 kilometers west of Madrid City center.      

Lower School Building      

Learning Commons 

Gymnasium

Purpose-built Early Childhood Center

Play Landscape

Middle School Building 

Zero-energy building with modern science labs

Performing Area and moveable furniture

Middle School Commons

Upper School Building 

Learning Commons

Cafeteria

Athletics Complex and Center for the Sciences

Gymnasium

Fitness and weights room

Health and yoga room

Science & Robotics Labs

ASM Innovation, Design, and Education Hub 

The Da Vinci Space

Center for the Arts

600-seat Auditorium

Art classrooms

Music classrooms

Drama classroom

Multi-purpose room

Outdoor Campus

All-purpose weather track 

Turf soccer field

Multi-purpose field for baseball and other sports

Two tennis courts

Outdoor Play and Learning Landscape (2023)

Accreditation 

ASM is accredited by: 
 The International Baccalaureate Organization 
 The Spanish Ministry of Education 
 The Middle States Association of Schools and Colleges 
They are affiliated with:
	the European Council of International Schools (ECIS)
	the National Association of Independent Schools (NAIS)
	the Mediterranean Association of International Schools (MAIS).

Demographics 

ASM is made up of 33.3% U.S. citizens, 33.3% Spanish citizens, and 33.3% international students from more than 50 countries all over the world. 

In the 2021-2022 school year, average enrollment was 100.

Faculty 

In the 2020-2021 school year, there were 193 faculty members. 

Among the staff are several technology coordinators and assistants, guidance counselors for each school, librarians, nurses, maintenance staff and administrators, including the Heads of Admissions, Development, and Communications.

Student activities 

ASM offers the following extracurricular activities:
Boomwhackers Club
Art Club
Arts and crafts
Ceramics
Computer Art and Graphics
Drama for Middle School and for Upper School
Photography
Computer Programming
Science Club
Study Skills
Computer Club
Creative Correspondence
Games for Fun: Scrabble, Juggling
Music Theatre
Journalism Club
Theater Stage Design
Scouting

Athletics 

ASM has 2 outdoor tennis courts, 2 basketball courts, 2 turf soccer fields, a baseball diamond, and 2 gymnasiums.

Tennis
Soccer
Volleyball
Basketball 
Golf
Ballet
Tap
Modern Jazz
Baseball

Notable alumni
Lincoln Díaz-Balart, former Republican congressman from Florida.

References

External links 
 The American School of Madrid
 U.S. Department of State

 International schools in the Community of Madrid
Madrid
 Private schools in Spain
 Educational institutions established in 1961
 1961 establishments in Spain